The 1957 Baltimore Colts season was the fifth season for the team in the National Football League and their first with a winning record. Under fourth-year head coach Weeb Ewbank, the Colts posted a record of 7 wins and 5 losses, third in the Western Conference, one game behind Detroit and San Francisco.

With two games to play, Baltimore (7–3) was in first place with a one-game lead, but dropped their final two games on the West Coast.

This was the first season in which the Colts wore their trademark "horseshoe" logo in the middle of their helmet. The team had experimented with placement of the logo on other parts of the helmet, but 1957 was the year in which they used the logo that the Colts franchise still uses.

Regular season

Schedule

Standings

See also 
History of the Indianapolis Colts
Indianapolis Colts seasons
Colts–Patriots rivalry

References 

Baltimore Colts
1957
Baltimore Colts